Heavy Load is a Swedish heavy metal band from Stockholm. The band is often hailed as the first Swedish heavy metal band, and were known for their Viking themes. The Wahlquist brothers, who founded the band in 1976 along with Michael Backler, were later producers and owners of Thunderload Records in Sweden, were at one point producing Veni Domine, and also were considering releasing a new album, though that never occurred. 

Various touring and demo line-ups of the band have included UFO and The Damned bass player Paul Gray, Treat guitarist Leif Liljegren, and renowned architect Eero Koivisto. Phil Lynott of Thin Lizzy played on one of the band's released songs.

Misfortune struck when Thunderload Studios got severely damaged due to a water leakage in the 2000s, which meant a halt to its official existence. After the breakup, the members then went on and performed with other bands.

The band reformed in October 2017 and announced a series of shows for 2018, including an appearance at that year's Sweden Rock Festival in June.

Discography

Albums
 Full Speed at High Level (1978)
 Metal Conquest (EP, 1981)
 Death or Glory (1982)
 Stronger Than Evil (1983) (Phil Lynott playing bass guitar on the track "Free")

Others
 "Take Me Away" (single, 1982)
 Live (VHS, 1983)
 "Free" (single, 1983) (Phil Lynott playing bass guitar on the track "Free")
 "Monsters of the Night" (single, 1985)

Band members

Current members
 Styrbjörn Wahlquist – drums, vocals, percussion (1976–1985, 2017–present)
 Ragne Wahlquist – guitars, vocals, keyboards (1976–1985, 2017–present)
 Torbjörn Ragnesjö – bass guitar (1979–1984, 2017–present)
 Nic Savage - guitars (2018-present)

Former members
 Paul Gray - bass guitar (1986-??)
 Patrick Karlsson - guitar (1986 - ??)
 Andreas Fritz – bass guitar (1984-1985)
 Leif Liljegren – guitar (1979)
 Eero Koivisto – bass guitar (1979)
 Dan Molén – bass guitar (1978–1979)
 Michael Backler – bass guitar (1976–1977)
 Eddy Malm – guitar, vocals (1978–1985)
 Micke Söderström – Keyboards (2018)
 Johan Westre – Keyboards (2018)

Timeline

References

External links
 Heavy Load Official webpage

Swedish heavy metal musical groups
Musical groups established in 1976
1976 establishments in Sweden
Musical groups disestablished in 1985
Musical groups reestablished in 2017
2017 establishments in Sweden
Sibling musical groups